The following is a list of Seattle Mariners uniform promotion games. The games are often known as the "Turn Back the Clock Night" where they don throwback uniforms. The Mariners have played games in promotional uniforms since the 1993 season, excluding 2000–2004 and 2020. In 1994, the Mariners played the Oakland Athletics in a promotion titled "Salute to the [Seattle] Rainiers" where the two teams donned 1955 Pacific Coast League uniforms. In 1995 and 2015 the Mariners wore uniforms from the Seattle Steelheads, a short-lived Negro league baseball team based in Seattle, Washington. A Seattle Steelheads vs. Kansas City Monarchs themed game scheduled for June 20, 2020 was canceled during that abbreviated season, and for Juneteenth (June 19), 2021, the Mariners wore Steelhead uniforms against the Rays for a Salute to the Negro Leagues event (the Rays wore their regular uniforms). Although not a "throwback", the Mariners have played two games in futuristic styled uniforms on a promotion night titled, "Turn Ahead the Clock". The "Turn Ahead the Clock" game was originated by the Mariners promotional staff in 1998, and in 1999 the promotion was picked up by 19 other Major League Baseball (MLB) franchises. Outfielder Ken Griffey Jr. helped design the original 1998 uniforms. Although the league-wide promotion has been criticized, the original Mariners' promotion proved successful. In all, the Mariners have played 26 uniform promotion games. Their all-time record is eleven wins, and fifteen losses. The Mariners have played the Kansas City Royals five times, including their first jersey promotion game on May 21, 1993. The Mariners have also played the Oakland Athletics (four times), the Houston Astros and San Diego Padres (three times each),  the Los Angeles Angels of Anaheim and Milwaukee Brewers (twice each), and seven other teams (once each). The Mariners have played 18 uniform promotion games at home, and eight away.

Games

Gallery

References

External links
"Turn Back the Clock" — Fan collection of information and picture of the promotion games

Uniform promotion games